Gliese 832 (Gl 832 or GJ 832) is a red dwarf of spectral type M2V in the southern constellation Grus. The apparent visual magnitude of 8.66 means that it is too faint to be seen with the naked eye. It is located relatively close to the Sun, at a distance of 16.2 light years and has a high proper motion of 818.16 milliarcseconds per year. Gliese 832 has just under half the mass and radius of the Sun. Its estimated rotation period is a relatively leisurely 46 days. The star is roughly 6 billion years old.

This star achieved perihelion some 52,920 years ago when it came within an estimated  of the Sun.

Gliese 832 emits X-rays. Despite the strong flare activity, Gliese 832 is producing on average less ionizing radiation than the Sun. Only at extremely short radiation wavelengths (<50nm) does its radiation intensity rise above the level of quiet Sun, but does not reach levels typical for active Sun.

Planetary system
Gliese 832 hosts one known planet, with a second planet having been refuted in 2022.

In September 2008, it was announced that a Jupiter-like planet, designated Gliese 832 b, had been detected in a long-period, near-circular orbit around this star (false alarm probability thus far: a negligible 0.05%). It would induce an astrometric perturbation on its star of at least 0.95 milliarcseconds and is thus a good candidate for being detected by astrometric observations. Despite its relatively large angular distance,  direct imaging is problematic due to the star–planet contrast. The orbital solution of the planet was refined in 2011.

Gliese 832 c

In 2014, a second planet, Gliese 832 c, was discovered by astronomers at the University of New South Wales. This planet was believed to be of super-Earth mass. It was announced to orbit in the optimistic habitable zone but outside the conservative habitable zone of its parent star. The planet Gliese 832 c was believed to be in, or very close to, the right distance from its sun to allow liquid water to exist on its surface. However, doubts were raised about the existence of planet c by a 2015 study, which found that its orbital period is close to the stellar rotation period. The existence of the planet was refuted in 2022, when a study found that the radial velocity signal shows characteristics of a signal originating from stellar activity, and not from a planet.

The region between Gliese 832 b and Gliese 832 c is a zone where additional planets are possible.

Search for cometary disc
If this system has a comet disc, it is undetectable "brighter than the fractional dust luminosity 10−5" of a recent Herschel study.

See also
 List of nearest stars
 List of extrasolar planets

Notes

References

 
Local Bubble
M-type main-sequence stars
204961
106440
Grus (constellation)
CD-49 13515
J21333397-4900323
Planetary systems with one confirmed planet
TIC objects